Mudos may refer to:

 Mudos, the main continent in the Oddworld fictional universe
 MudOS, a variant of the LPMud computer gaming system